Aaron Cross (born in Waterloo, Iowa, on June 28, 1975) is a quadriplegic American archer.

Education and sport 
He graduated from Augsburg College in 1997. He competed in the 1996 Summer Paralympics and in the 2000 Summer Paralympics, but did not medal either time. He went on to compete in the 2002 Wheelchair Archery World Championships in Nymburk. Finally as a member of the American team he won bronze in Archery at the 2004 Summer Paralympics. 
Aaron is currently working on his Masters in Vocational Rehabilitation Counseling at Saint Cloud State University.

Aaron has been featured in nationally syndicated magazines such as, Sport' N Spokes, Paraplegic News, Target and Spirit Magazine along with being featured on local, regional and national print and electronic media such as ABC and NBC.

Assistance in accomplishing personal goals, sports goals, business goals, whatever they may be; yes even assistance in writing resumes, organization, building self-confidence and daily living skills.

SCSU advance delegation to assess accessibility for Beijing, China
U.S. Team Captain for the 2000 and 2004 Paralympic Archery Team
Team Bronze 2004 Paralympic Medal Winner — archery
Athlete Representative to the U.S. Olympic Committee for archery, 1996-2003
Paralympic Committee (USOC, USPC) for archery, 2000–02
Governor to the Minnesota State Archery Association, 2000–02
Target VP to the Minnesota State Archery Association, 2002–04
President of the St. Cloud Archery Association, 2000-2004
Technical Delegate to International Paralympic Committee, 1996-2000

Safari Club International Pathfinder Award, 2013
Judd Jacobson Award for Success in Community and Professional, 2011
Augsburg College Decade Award for Excellence in Profession and Community, 2005
Paralympic Athlete
•	Three-time Paralympic team member, 1996, 2000, 2004
•	Team Bronze in 2004, fifth in 2000, fourth in 1996,
•	Member of U.S. World Archery Team
o	Team Silver 2002
o	Bronze 1994
o	Gold 1993
SEAL Adventure Challenge (SAC)

•	Completed Navy SEAL STA for a second time, 2009

•	First person in a wheelchair ever to attempt and finish a Navy SEAL (SAC) training course 2005

Toastmasters International of District Six, Speaker of the Year for Communication and Leadership in Community, State and Profession 2000

Augsburg College, Key Maker Award Recognition for Academic Achievement, Personal Growth, in College and Career 1997

Technical High School Commencement Speaker, St. Cloud, MN, 1993

The accident that paralyzed him occurred when he was training for the Olympics.

References

External links 
Motivation on Wheels site

1975 births
American male archers
Archers at the 1996 Summer Paralympics
Archers at the 2000 Summer Paralympics
Archers at the 2004 Summer Paralympics
Paralympic bronze medalists for the United States
Augsburg University alumni
Sportspeople from Waterloo, Iowa
Living people
People with tetraplegia
Medalists at the 2004 Summer Paralympics
Paralympic medalists in archery
Paralympic archers of the United States